Leonard Hubert "Lennie" Hoffmann, Baron Hoffmann   (born 8 May 1934) is a retired senior South African–British judge. He served as a Lord of Appeal in Ordinary from 1995 to 2009.

Well known for his lively decisions and willingness to break with convention, he has had an especially large impact on the interpretation of contracts, shareholder actions in UK company law, in restricting tort liability for public authorities, human rights and intellectual property law, in particular patents. Currently, he serves as a Non-Permanent Judge of the Court of Final Appeal of Hong Kong.

Early life
Born 8 May 1934 in Cape Town, Leonard Hubert Hoffmann was the son of a well-known solicitor who co-founded what has become Africa's largest law firm, Edward Nathan Sonnenbergs.

Education
He was educated at the University of Cape Town and then attended The Queen's College, Oxford, as a Rhodes Scholar, where he studied for the BCL degree and won the Vinerian Scholarship.

Between 1961 and 1973, he was Stowell Civil Law Fellow at University College, Oxford, where he is an Honorary Fellow.

Legal career
In 1963, he published the first edition of The South African Law of Evidence, a work which became the standard text and which has since been published in four editions. After being called to the Bar from Gray's Inn in 1964, Hoffmann became one of the most sought after and highly priced barristers of his generation and was quickly made a judge, having taken silk on 19 April 1977.

Judicial career
He was appointed to the Courts of Appeal of Jersey and Guernsey on 20 November 1980 and stayed in office until 1985 and was appointed to the High Court of Justice, Chancery Division from 1985 to 1992. On 23 July 1985, he was knighted upon his appointment, as is customary for High Court judges.

He was subsequently appointed to be a Lord Justice of Appeal on 1 October 1992 and stayed in office until 1995. In 1995, Hoffmann was appointed a Lord of Appeal in Ordinary (more commonly known as a Law Lord) and thereby raised to the peerage as Baron Hoffmann, of Chedworth in the County of Gloucestershire.

Twinsectra v Yardley (trust law) and MacNiven v Westmoreland (tax law) are prominent examples of his judicial positions. Both cases led to differences of view between him and Lord Millett. Hoffmann gave the leading judgment in Investors Compensation Scheme Ltd v West Bromwich Building Society, in which he set out five principles for interpreting contracts.

He retired as a Law Lord on 20 April 2009 and joined the Centre for Commercial Law Studies, Queen Mary, University of London, as Honorary Professor of Intellectual Property Law.

Hong Kong Court of Final Appeal
Hoffmann has been a Non-Permanent Judge of the Hong Kong Court of Final Appeal since 1998.

In 2014 he was awarded the Gold Bauhinia Star by the Chief Executive of Hong Kong.

Links with Amnesty International
Hoffmann's failure to declare his links with Amnesty International before ruling on whether Augusto Pinochet was immune from prosecution led to the unprecedented setting aside of a House of Lords judgment. He later commented to the Daily Telegraph that "the fact is I'm not biased. I am a lawyer. I do things as a judge. The fact that my wife works as a secretary for Amnesty International is, as far as I am concerned, neither here nor there."

Family
Leonard and Gillian Hoffmann have two daughters and two grandchildren.

Opinions in terrorism cases
Hoffmann was involved in three important judgments of the House of Lords concerning terrorism: Secretary of State for the Home Department v Rehman [2001] UKHL 47; A v Secretary of State for the Home Department [2004] UKHL 56; and A v. Secretary of State for the Home Department [2005] UKHL 71. In Rehman, at para 62, he wrote:Postscript. I wrote this speech some three months before the recent events in New York and Washington. They are a reminder that in matters of national security, the cost of failure can be high. This seems to me to underline the need for the  judicial arm of government to respect the decisions of ministers of the Crown on the question of whether support for  terrorist activities in a foreign country constitutes a threat to national security. It is not only that the executive has access to special information and expertise in these matters. It is also that such decisions, with serious potential results for the community, require a legitimacy which can  be conferred only by entrusting them to persons responsible to the community through the democratic process. If the people are to accept the consequences of such decisions, they must be made by persons whom the people have elected and whom they can remove.

It appeared that he was willing to defer to the executive in matters concerning national security in the fairly long  tradition of English judges deferring to the executive in such matters, including Lord Denning in ex-parte Hosenball. However, in 2004, Hoffmann took a robust stand (joining the majority of judges in the decision) against the executive in the Belmarsh case, A v. SSHD [2004] UKHL 56. In this case Hoffmann wrote at para 97 that: The real  threat to the life  of the nation, in the sense of a people living in accordance with its traditional laws and political values,  comes not from terrorism but from laws such as these. That is the true measure of what terrorism may achieve. It is for Parliament to decide whether to give the terrorists such a victory.

In A v. Secretary of State for the Home Department [2005] UKHL 71, Hoffmann said:The use of torture is dishonourable. It corrupts and degrades the state which uses it and the legal system which accepts it.

Notable judgments
Re Augustus Barnett & Son Ltd [1986] BCLC 170
Improver v Remington [1990] FSR 181
Nestle v National Westminster Bank plc [1992] EWCA Civ 12, [1993] 1 WLR 1260 -  English trusts law concerning the duty of care when a trustee is making an investment; Hoffmann's decision supported on appeal
Bishopsgate Investment Management Ltd v Maxwell (No 2) [1993] BCLC 814 - UK company law concerning a director's duty to act for proper purposes of the company.
Re D'Jan of London Ltd [1994] 1 BCLC 561, [1993] BCC 646
William Sindall plc v Cambridgeshire County Council [1994] 1 WLR 1016
Re Saul D Harrison & Sons plc [1995] 1 BCLC 14, [1994] BCC 475
Biogen Inc v Medeva plc [1997] RPC 1 [1996] UKHL 18
South Australia Asset Management Corp v York Montague Ltd [1996] UKHL 10, [1997] AC 191
Co-operative Insurance Society Ltd v Argyll Stores [1997] UKHL 17
Investors Compensation Scheme Ltd v West Bromwich Building Society [1997] UKHL 28
Banque Financiere de la Cite v Parc (Battersea) Ltd [1998] UKHL 7
O'Neill v Phillips [1999] UKHL 24, [1999] 1 WLR 1092
Bruton v London & Quadrant Housing Trust [2000] 1 AC 406
Secretary of State for the Home Department v. Rehman [2001] UKHL 47
Standard Chartered Bank v Pakistan National Shipping Corp [2003] 1 AC 959
Kirin-Amgen v Hoechst Marion Roussel [2004] UKHL 46
A v Secretary of State for the Home Department [2004] UKHL 56
A v Secretary of State for the Home Department [2005] UKHL 71
OBG Ltd v Allan [2007] UKHL 21, [2008] 1 AC 1, [2007] 2 WLR 920
Transfield Shipping Inc v Mercator Shipping Inc or The Achilleas [2008] UKHL 48
Attorney General of Belize v Belize Telecom Ltd [2009] UKPC 10

Publications 
A selection of his extra-judicial writings:

 "Anthropomorphic justice: The reasonable man and his friends" (2010) 29(2) The Law Teacher 127
"Language and Lawyers" [2018] 134 Law Quarterly Review 553

References

External links
Universality of Human Rights, Hoffmann's lecture, 2009

1934 births
Living people
South African Rhodes Scholars
Alumni of The Queen's College, Oxford
Alumni of South African College Schools
Fellows of The Queen's College, Oxford
Law lords
Crossbench life peers
English Jews
Hong Kong judges
Justices of the Court of Final Appeal (Hong Kong)
Members of the Privy Council of the United Kingdom
Members of Gray's Inn
Amnesty International people
University of Cape Town alumni
Members of the Judicial Committee of the Privy Council
People from Cape Town
Recipients of the Gold Bauhinia Star
Knights Bachelor
South African emigrants to the United Kingdom
Chancery Division judges
Jewish British politicians
South African Jews